Farewell (literally The Farewell Affair) is a 2009 French espionage thriller film directed by Christian Carion, starring Guillaume Canet and Emir Kusturica.  The film is loosely based on the actions of the high-ranking KGB official, Vladimir Vetrov.  It was released in the United States in June 2010. It was adapted from the book Bonjour Farewell: La vérité sur la taupe française du KGB (1997) by Serguei Kostine.

The movie was filmed in Ukraine and Finland because Russia refused to provide a permit for filming in Moscow. A Reuters news item also stated that the government "dissuaded Russian movie actor Sergei Makovetsky and Russian producer and director Nikita Mikhalkov from participating in the film" (according to the director).

Plot
In the early 1980s, a high-ranking KGB analyst, Sergei Grigoriev, disillusioned with the Soviet regime, decides to pass Soviet secrets, including a list of their spies, to the government of France, then under the newly elected President François Mitterrand, a Socialist in coalition with the Communist Party. Grigoriev (code-named Farewell by the French intelligence service) hopes to force change in the Soviet Union by revealing their extensive network of spies trying to acquire scientific, technical and industrial information from the West.  He uses Pierre Froment, a naïve French engineer based in Moscow, as his unlikely intermediary. After the first transfer of information, Pierre confides in his wife Jessica, who is adamant about his stopping this activity in order to safeguard their family. Grigoriev persuades Pierre to continue without telling Jessica. He will accept neither money nor defection as a reward, but sometimes requests small gifts from Pierre's trips to France, such as a Sony Walkman and Queen cassette tapes for his son, some cognac, or books of French poetry.  As Farewell's prodigious output blossoms, the French are bewildered by the sheer scale and yield of top Western technology transferred covertly to the Soviets.

Under suspicion that he is not a trustworthy ally, Mitterrand personally hands U.S. President Ronald Reagan a dossier of invaluable Farewell data during the Ottawa G7 summit. The Americans are astounded with it and other information provided by Farewell, culminating in the full "List X" of Soviet spies within the highest echelons of the Western scientific and industrial apparatus. They embark on an ambitious plan to feed the Soviets erroneous or defective data; shortly afterwards, the network of Soviet technology spies in the West is rolled up, and Reagan announces the "Star Wars" antimissile shield project.  Deprived of hi-tech information from the West, and with their own laboratories falling behind, the Soviet leadership panics.  Seeing this desperate impasse for what it is, Mikhail Gorbachev, then an upwards-mobile party official, starts preparing the reform policies he is to pursue in the future.

Grigoriev's superior, a double agent for the CIA, is directed by them to sacrifice Grigoriev and save the Froments, all unbeknownst to the French.  Grigoriev, under arrest and KGB interrogation, plays dumb to give the Froments time to escape.  They cover their tracks and flee by car to the Finnish border.  While in West Germany for debriefing, Pierre pleads with the CIA Director to save Grigoriev, praising his integrity and selflessness.  The director refuses as a policy principle, having brought the other agent to the West.  Grigoriev is granted his request of execution by a marksman on the jetty of the snow-clad lake he loves.  Pierre is later offered a company job in Manhattan.

Cast
 Emir Kusturica as Sergei Grigoriev (the character based on Vetrov)
 Guillaume Canet as Pierre Froment, an engineer working in the Moscow branch of French electronics conglomerate Thomson-CSF 
 Alexandra Maria Lara as Jessica Froment, Pierre's wife
 Willem Dafoe as Feeney, Director of the Central Intelligence Agency
 Fred Ward as U.S. President Ronald Reagan
 Philippe Magnan as President François Mitterrand of France
 Niels Arestrup as Vallier, Director of the DST
 David Soul as Hutton, aide to President Reagan
 Ingeborga Dapkunaite as Natasha, Grigoriev's wife
 Dina Korzun as Alina, a colleague and mistress that Grigoriev is having an affair with
 Yevgeni Vasilyevich Kharlanov as Igor, the Grigorievs' rebellious son
 Christian Sandström as Federal Bureau of Investigation agent
 Diane Kruger, Benno Fürmann, Gary Lewis and Alex Ferns, amongst others, have cameos.

Reception
On review aggregator Rotten Tomatoes, the film holds an approval rating of 86% based on 77 reviews, with an average rating of 7.06/10. On Metacritic, the film has a weighted average score of 74 out of 100, based on 25 critics, indicating "generally favorable reviews".

See also
 Farewell Dossier

Further reading
Thomas C. Reed, At the Abyss: An Insider’s History of the Cold War (2004)
 Sergei Kostin and Eric Raynaud, Adieu Farewell (Laffont, Paris, 2009, in French); "Farewell" (AmazonCrossing, Aug. 2011, in English). First complete investigation of the Farewell Dossier and its international impact.
 Michel Louyot, Le Violon de neige (Publibook, Paris, 2008; soon to be available in English).

References

External links
 
 Screendaily.com review 
 Bluefat review 
 The interviews with Director and actors

2009 films
2000s French-language films
2000s English-language films
2000s Russian-language films
Films directed by Christian Carion
Films shot in Ukraine
Films shot in Finland
French spy thriller films
2000s spy thriller films
Cold War films
Films set in the 1980s
Cultural depictions of Ronald Reagan
Cultural depictions of Mikhail Gorbachev
Films set in the Soviet Union
Films set in Moscow
Films scored by Clint Mansell
France 2 Cinéma films
Canal+ films
Films about the Central Intelligence Agency
2000s French films